The Bacchanal of the Andrians or The Andrians is an oil painting by Titian. It is signed "TICIANUS </small>F</small>.[aciebat]" and is dated to 1523–1526.

History
The painting was made by Titian for the Sala dei Baccanali in the Camerini d'alabastro for Alfonso I d'Este, after The Worship of Venus (1518–1519) and Bacchus and Ariadne (1520–1523) and Titian's intervention on The Feast of the Gods by Bellini in 1524–1525 where he retouched the landscape to match the style of the other paintings.

In 1598, control of Ferrara passed to the Papal State and the Este family had to withdraw to Modena. During the transfer, cardinal and papal legate Pietro Aldobrandini appropriated many paintings, among which were The Bacchanal and The Worship of Venus. Aldobrandini never exhibited the taken paintings. His theft only became known in 1629 after the paintings had come into the Ludovisi inheritance and then were sold to the Duke of Monterrey in payment of the Principality of Piombino. They were then donated to Philip IV of Spain in 1639. The first documentation of the paintings in Spain date to the inventories of the Royal Alcázar of Madrid in 1666, 1686, and 1700.

The three canvases of Titian were admired and copied as much in Italy as in Spain by artists like Pieter Paul Rubens, Guido Reni, Nicolas Poussin, and Diego Velázquez, and they contributed to the development of the Baroque style. Rubens' copies of The Bacchanal are housed at the Nationalmuseum in Stockholm. The Italian artist Domenichino famously wept upon hearing that the masterpieces had left Italy.

In 1782, British painter Joshua Reynolds admired The Bacchanal, which inspired him to draw a parallel between Titian and the Latin poet Virgil:

The painting is now held at the Museo del Prado in Madrid.

Description and style

Mythology

The painting is set on the island of Andros. A sleeping nymph and a urinating boy are seen in the lower right foreground while men and women celebrate with jugs of wine. The absence of Bacchus from the painting is explained by Erwin Panofsky, who suggests that the god must be on the departing ship seen in the center background. Due to the artistic liberties Titian took in painting these figures, it is difficult to identify them.

The decorative programme included other major paintings celebrating Bacchus and Venus, the gods of wine and love. Like its predecessor Bacchus and Ariadne, The Bacchanal of the Andrians was inspired by the Imagines of Philostratus.

Music
The musical score lying in the foreground, suggesting a link between music and Dionysian pleasures, is a whimsical canon in French:

The song is attributed to Ferrarese court musician Adrian Willaert. Its presence in the painting hints at the connection between music theory in Ferrara and Titian's musically influenced use of color.

In the painting, however, none of the instruments are being played. The only instruments portrayed are the "straight flute". Two are held by the girls in the foreground, and a third is on the ground behind them and near a glass of wine, an overturned metal cup, and a tray of libations.

References

External links 

1523 paintings
Paintings by Titian in the Museo del Prado
Paintings depicting Greek myths
Nude art
Paintings commissioned for the camerini d'alabastro
Dogs in paintings by Titian
Ships in art
Food and drink paintings
Mythological paintings by Titian